Elizabeth Mary Wright (10 October 1863 – 1958) was an English linguist and folklorist.

Biography
Elizabeth Mary Lea was born in the East End of London on 10 October 1863, the eldest daughter of an Anglican clergyman. After a year in Somerset, the family moved in 1873 to Tedstone Delamere in Herefordshire. After a period at boarding school Elizabeth lived at home "a very easy and pleasant life, though uneventful and rather useless", until Sophie Weisse, the older sister of her brother's schoolfriend, encouraged her to "aim at more profitable employment of my time and such talents as I possessed." At her father's suggestion she applied to Lady Margaret Hall, Oxford, where she was accepted, matriculating in October 1887.

She first encountered Joseph Wright in her second year at Lady Margaret Hall, when she attended his Old English lectures. During her third year, he enquired about her willingness "to do eventually some original work" and she subsequently worked under him to prepare a grammar of the dialect of Northumbria. Elizabeth and Joseph married in 1896. Together the Wrights compiled The English Dialect Dictionary in six volumes between 1898 and 1905. Elizabeth undertook most of the secretarial work for the dictionary which included numerous letters and "50,000 prospectuses".

On 2 July 1934 Wright was awarded an honorary degree of Doctor of Letters from the University of Leeds.

After Joseph's death in 1930, Elizabeth published a two-volume biography of him. In Joseph Wright's Dictionary of National Biography entry they are recorded as being described by contemporaries as "the happiest couple in Oxford". They had two children who died in childhood. She died in 1958 and was buried in Wolvercote Cemetery.

Publications

Books

 (Vol. 1 and Vol. 2.)
with Joseph Wright

 (Abridgement of preceding work.)

Articles

References

1863 births
1958 deaths
Linguists from England
Women linguists
Historical linguists
English philologists
Alumni of Lady Margaret Hall, Oxford
Women folklorists